Segert may refer to:

 Josef Ferdinand Norbert Segert (Seger, Seeger, Seegr) (1716–1782), a Bohemian organist
 Stanislav Segert (1921–2005), a Czech scholar of Semitic languages

See also 
 Related surnames
 Seger
 Seghers

References

German-language surnames
Surnames of Czech origin